Shchetinka is a rural locality and the administrative center of Shchetinsky Selsoviet Rural Settlement, Kursky District, Kursk Oblast, Russia. Population:

Geography 
The village is located on the Tuskar River (a right tributary of the Seym), 97 km from the Russia–Ukraine border, at the northern border of the district center – the town Kursk.

 Streets
There are the following streets in the locality: Energetikov, Lugovaya, Osennyaya, Rechnaya and Rozhdestvenskaya (245 houses).

 Climate
Shchetinka has a warm-summer humid continental climate (Dfb in the Köppen climate classification).

Transport 
Shchetinka is located 7 km from the federal route  Crimea Highway (a part of the European route ), on the road of regional importance  (Kursk – Ponyri), 1 km from the nearest railway halt 4 km (railway line Kursk – 146 km).

The rural locality is situated 5 km from Kursk Vostochny Airport, 128 km from Belgorod International Airport and 207 km from Voronezh Peter the Great Airport.

References

Notes

Sources

Rural localities in Kursky District, Kursk Oblast